The following television stations operate on virtual channel 36 in the United States:

 K16KE-D in Baudette, Minnesota
 K23BJ-D in Lake Havasu City, Arizona
 K23LH-D in Cortez, Colorado
 K26PL-D in Roswell, New Mexico
 K30OM-D in Monterey, California
 K33OV-D in Whitehall, Montana
 K36AB-D in Lawton, Oklahoma
 K36DB-CD in Avon/Vail, Colorado
 K36EW-D in College Place, Washington
 K36GJ-D in Agana, Guam
 K36II-D in Joplin, Missouri
 K36IO-D in Manhattan, Kansas
 K36JH-D in Barstow, California
 K36KE-D in Ardmore, Oklahoma
 K36LD-D in College Station, Texas
 K36LW-D in Williams, Minnesota
 K36MU-D in Texarkana, Arkansas
 K36NB-D in Incline Village, Nevada
 K36ND-D in Victoria, Texas
 K36NZ-D in Clarkston, Washington
 K36OS-D in Whitehall, Montana
 K36QA-D in Lufkin, Texas
 K36QM-D in Iowa, Louisiana
 KAJR-LD in Des Moines, Iowa
 KBFK-LP in Bakersfield, California
 KBNS-CD in Branson, Missouri
 KBTR-CD in Baton Rouge, Louisiana
 KDTF-LD in San Diego, California
 KEVE-LD in Vancouver, Washington
 KFFS-CD in Fayetteville, Arkansas
 KGKM-LD in Columbia, Missouri
 KHIN in Red Oak, Iowa
 KICU-TV in San Jose, California
 KJTB-LD in Paragould, Arkansas
 KKAP in Little Rock, Arkansas
 KKAX-LD in Hilltop, Arizona
 KLGV-LD in Longview, Texas
 KMIR-TV in Palm Springs, California
 KMTW in Hutchinson, Kansas
 KPBT-TV in Odessa, Texas
 KQIN in Davenport, Iowa
 KQRY-LD in Fort Smith, Arkansas
 KSFL-TV in Sioux Falls, South Dakota
 KTVC in Roseburg, Oregon
 KTVS-LD in Albuquerque, New Mexico
 KUOK-CD in Oklahoma City, Oklahoma
 KWYT-LD in Yakima, Washington
 KXAN-TV in Austin, Texas
 KYUB-LD in Yuba City, California
 W17EE-D in Lilesville/Wadesboro, North Carolina
 W30DZ-D in Fence, Wisconsin
 W34FR-D in Ithaca, New York
 W36DO-D in Darby, Pennsylvania
 W36EA-D in Tallahassee, Florida
 W36EC-D in Bartow, Florida
 W36EI-D in Wausau, Wisconsin
 W36EO-D in La Grange, Georgia
 W36EQ-D in Liberal, Kansas
 W36EX-D in Alton, Illinois
 W36FB-D in Biscoe, North Carolina
 W36FH-D in Traverse City, Michigan
 W36FM-D in Etna, Maine
 WAPK-CD in Bristol, Virginia/Kingsport, Tennessee
 WATL in Atlanta, Georgia
 WCAY-CD in Key West, Florida
 WCIV in Charleston, South Carolina
 WCNC-TV in Charlotte, North Carolina
 WDNP-LD in St. Petersburg, Florida
 WDWL in Bayamon, Puerto Rico
 WDYC-LD in Cincinnati, Ohio
 WENY-TV in Elmira, New York
 WFIQ in Florence, Alabama
 WFTX-TV in Cape Coral, Florida
 WGCW-LD in Albany, Georgia
 WGPT in Oakland, Maryland
 WKIN-CD in Weber County, Virginia/Kingsport, Tennessee
 WLEF-TV in Park Falls, Wisconsin
 WMDE in Dover, Delaware
 WMVT in Milwaukee, Wisconsin
 WNTE-LD in Mayaguez, Puerto Rico
 WQAP-LD in Montgomery, Alabama
 WQEK-LD in Clarksdale, Mississippi
 WSBE-TV in Providence, Rhode Island
 WTVQ-DT in Lexington, Kentucky
 WUNP-TV in Roanoke, Rapids, North Carolina
 WUPW in Toledo, Ohio
 WZXZ-CD in Orlando, etc., Florida

The following stations, which formerly operated on virtual channel 36, are no longer licensed:
 K36KA-D in Rolla, Missouri
 W31DL-D in Ponce, Puerto Rico
 W34FV-D in Soperton, Georgia

References

36 virtual